Vacations in Majorca is a 1959 Italian comedy film directed by Giorgio Bianchi.

Plot
Anselmo Pandolfini lives in Palma de Mallorca. He meets a famous American diva Mary Moore who initially dislikes him, but persuades her to let him act as her bodyguard.

Cast 

Alberto Sordi: Anselmo Pandolfini   
Gino Cervi: André Breton   
Belinda Lee: Mary Moore   
Dorian Gray: Hélène    
Antonio Cifariello: Ernesto   
Rossana Martini: Angela 
Mercedes Alonso: Clementina   
Vicente Parra: Gianni    
Giulio Paradisi: Miguel

Production
The cast featured British actor Belinda Lee, then based in Europe.

References

External links

Film page at BFI
1959 comedy films
1959 films
Italian comedy films
Films directed by Giorgio Bianchi
Films about vacationing
1950s Italian films